Matt Pryor (born December 16, 1994) is an American football offensive tackle who is a free agent. He played college football for TCU.

Professional career
At TCU's Pro Day, Pryor ran a 5.6 40-yard dash and did 23 bench press reps of 225 pounds.

Philadelphia Eagles
Pryor was drafted by the Philadelphia Eagles in the sixth round (206th overall) of the 2018 NFL Draft.

He made his first start at right guard in January 2020, during a playoff loss to the Seattle Seahawks. Pryor filled in for the injured Brandon Brooks.

Pryor was placed on the reserve/COVID-19 list by the team on October 16, 2020, and activated on October 22.

Indianapolis Colts
On August 31, 2021, the Eagles traded Pryor and a 2022 seventh-round pick to the Indianapolis Colts for a 2022 sixth-round pick.

On March 16, 2022, Pryor signed a one-year contract extension worth $5.5 million with the Colts.

References

External links
TCU Horned Frogs bio

1994 births
Living people
American football offensive tackles
Players of American football from Long Beach, California
TCU Horned Frogs football players
Philadelphia Eagles players
Indianapolis Colts players